Mahnar Assembly constituency is an assembly constituency in Vaishali district in the Indian state of Bihar.

Overview
As per Delimitation of Parliamentary and Assembly constituencies Order, 2008, No. 129 Mahnar Assembly constituency is composed of the following: Mahnar  community development block; Borhan urf Rasulpur Gaus, Basantpur, Mohiuddinpur Garahi, Harprasad, Mahipura, Sohrathi, Mahisaur, Chandsarai, Dihbuchauli, Peerapur, Rasalpur Purushottam, Bishunpur Bedauliya, Saiyad Mahammad urf Salha, Khopi, Arniyan, Hazrat Jandaha, Bahsi Saidpur, Mukundpur Bhath and Loma gram panchayats of Jandaha community development block.

Mahnar Assembly constituency is part of No. 21 Hajipur (Lok Sabha constituency) (SC).

Members of Legislative Assembly

Election results

2020

1977-2010
In the 2010 state assembly elections, Dr. Achyuatanand of BJP won the Mahnar assembly seat defeating Rama Kishor Singh of LJP. Contests in most years were multi cornered but only winners and runners up are being mentioned. Rama Kishore Singh of LJP defeated Munshilal Rai of RJD in October 2005 and February 2005. Rama Kishore Singh of JD(U) defeated Munshilal Rai of RJD in 2000. Munshilal Rai of JD defeated Rama Kishore Singh, Independent, in 1995. Muneshwar Prasad Singh of SOP(L) defeated Raghupati of JD in 1985. Munshilal Rai of LD defeated Mithleshwar Prasad of Congress in 1985. Munshilal Rai of Janata Party (Secular – Charan Singh) defeated Ram Prasad Singh of Congress in 1980. Munshwar Prasad Singh of JP defeated Akhilesh Kumar Ray of Congress in 1977.

2015 and 2020
In 2015 Janata Dal (United) deflected from the National Democratic Alliance and allied with its chief rival Rashtriya Janata Dal to form a Grand Alliance called Mahagathbandhan. In the elections to Mahnar constituency in 2015 Umesh Kushwaha of JD (U) defeated Achyuthanand Singh with a large margin of 27000 votes. However, in 2020 Umesh Kushwaha lost to Bina Singh, the wife of Rama Kishor Singh who contested the 2020 election on Rashtriya Janata Dal symbol.

References

External links
 

Assembly constituencies of Bihar
Politics of Vaishali district